The 2012 Judo Grand Slam Moscow was held in Moscow, Russia, from 26 to 27 May 2012.

Medal summary

Men's events

Women's events

Source Results

Medal table

References

External links
 

2012 IJF World Tour
2012 Judo Grand Slam
Judo
Judo competitions in Russia
Judo
Judo